My Boyfriend Is an Angel is a 2012 Russian comedy film directed by Vera Storozheva.

Plot 
The film takes place in a metropolis. The film tells about a student who does not believe that you can meet an angel. Angel Seraphim will try to prove to her that this is possible.

Cast 
 Artur Smolyaninov as Seraph
 Anna Starshenbaum as Alexander
 Sergey Puskepalis as Alexandra Pope
 Nikita Efremov
 Irina Khakamada as Director
 Yuriy Kutsenko as Professor
 Andrey Leonov as Taxi Driver
 Ivan Makarevich as Kolya
 Ivan Okhlobystin as Driver of Official's Car
 Olga Popova

References

External links 
 

2012 films
2010s Russian-language films
Russian comedy films
2012 comedy films